The Massachusetts Casino Repeal Initiative was an unsuccessful initiative voted on in the Massachusetts general election held on November 4, 2014. It was one of four 2014 ballot measures put to public vote.

Voting
Question 3 on the ballot, "Expanding Prohibitions on Gaming".

A YES VOTE would prohibit the Massachusetts Gaming Commission from issuing licenses for casinos and other gambling establishments (primarily those with table games and/or slot machines); this prohibition would void licenses previously issued. Wagering on live simulcast greyhound races would be illegal as well.

A NO VOTE leaves current state gaming laws as is.

Source:

References

Further reading

External links
 2014 Ballot Questions at sec.state.ma.us
 Question 3 text via masslive.com

2014 Massachusetts ballot measures
Initiatives in the United States
Casinos in Massachusetts